Mushfiqur Rahman (born January 1, 1980) is a Bangladeshi cricketer who played ten Tests and 28 One Day Internationals for Bangladesh between 2000 and 2004. Rahman played first-class cricket for Rajshahi.

External links
 

1980 births
Living people
Bangladesh One Day International cricketers
Bangladesh Test cricketers
Bangladeshi cricketers
Rajshahi Division cricketers
People from Rajshahi District
Cricketers at the 1998 Commonwealth Games
Commonwealth Games competitors for Bangladesh